Peter Blunden was  the Managing Director of The Herald and Weekly Times, publisher of News Limited titles in Victoria, Australia; the Herald Sun, Sunday Herald Sun, The Weekly Times and mX. 

A journalist, he was appointed to this role in 2001, after serving as the editor of the Herald Sun. The man to whom he reported, John Hartigan, said about him "He's a person who certainly expresses energy in everything he does". He is a board member of the Alannah and Madeline Foundation and the Royal Children's Hospital Foundation.

References

Living people
Australian journalists
Year of birth missing (living people)